Ploegsteert is a village of Wallonia and a district of the municipality of Comines-Warneton, located in the province of Hainaut, Belgium.

It is the most westerly settlement of Wallonia. Created in 1850 on part of the territory of Warneton, it includes the hamlet of Le Bizet, which is the border with France (there is also a hamlet named "Le Bizet" in France). It is largely francophone, with facilities for Dutch speakers.

In late 1914 and early 1915, the nearby Ploegsteert Wood was the site of fierce WWI fighting. Today there are numerous cemeteries and memorials, including the Hyde Park Corner (Royal Berks) CWGC Cemetery and the Berks CWGC Cemetery Extension with the Ploegsteert Memorial to the Missing, which commemorates more than 11,000 British and Empire servicemen who died outside the Ypres Salient and have no known grave. From January to May 1916, Winston Churchill served in the area as Commanding Officer (Lieutenant-Colonel) of the 6th Battalion of the Royal Scots Fusiliers.

As part of Comines-Warneton, Ploegsteert was declared a sister city of Wolverton, Buckinghamshire, England, in 2006; this was partly initiated through the finding of letters from a 16-year-old soldier from Wolverton named Albert French. He is buried in Hyde Park Corner (Royal Berks) Cemetery, just outside the village.

The village is home to a carpentry museum.

References

Former municipalities of Hainaut (province)
Comines-Warneton